Naupactus leucoloma is a species of broad-nosed weevil in the beetle family Curculionidae.

References

Further reading

External links

 

Curculionidae
Beetles described in 1840